The Uganda Wildlife Conservation Education Center (UWEC), popularly known as Entebbe Zoo, is a conservation center where all animals found in Uganda can be accessed.

History 
This area opened its doors in 1952 as a reception center for wild animals that were found as casualties, either injured, orphaned, sick, or confiscated from the illegal trade.

In the 1960s it changed its role into a zoo and non indigenous species like bears and tigers were introduced and kept as an attraction.

In 1994, wildlife management was restructured and the zoo turned into Uganda Wildlife Education Center trust. The aim was to develop the zoo with emphasis on conservation Education.

The center is host to free ranging and caged animals, birds, several tree species and shrubs.

Animals in the park include; Rock python, cheetah, leopard, lions, shoe bill stork, tortoise, giraffes, chimpanzees, baby elephant and Rhinos.

Functions 
The center functions as a conservation Education center, a rehabilitation center and a recreation center where people come to see a variety of wild animals.

The center contributes to scientific research and is committed to developing education programmes for the general public with emphasis on instilling a conservation ethic.

Location 
The center is located in Entebbe town, Wakiso District on the shores of Lake Victoria.

References 

Wildlife sanctuaries of Uganda